Maciej Hreniak (born May 3, 1989) is a Polish swimmer, who specialized in long-distance freestyle events. He represented his nation Poland at the 2008 Summer Olympics, and has won a career total of five medals (four golds and one bronze) in a major international competition, spanning the two editions of the European Junior Championships (2006 and 2007), and the 2006 FINA Youth World Swimming Championships in Rio de Janeiro, Brazil. Hreniak is a member of UKS Ruch Grudziądz, and is coached and trained by Marek Dorywaiski.

Hreniak competed for the Polish squad in the men's 1500 m freestyle at the 2008 Summer Olympics in Beijing. He posted a lifetime best of 15:10.78 to dominate the longest-distance freestyle and beat the insurmountable FINA A-cut (15:13.16) at the European Junior Championships a year earlier in Antwerp. Swimming as the fastest entrant in heat four, Hreniak managed to strengthen his pace from start to finish before taking the fourth spot in 15:16.16, just a wide five-second gap between him and the top three swimmers led by France's Nicolas Rostoucher. With only eight swimmers qualifying for the final, Hreniak stumbled down the leaderboard to twenty-fourth overall and did not advance past the prelims.

References

External links
NBC Olympics Profile

1989 births
Living people
Olympic swimmers of Poland
Swimmers at the 2008 Summer Olympics
Polish male freestyle swimmers
People from Brodnica County
Sportspeople from Kuyavian-Pomeranian Voivodeship
21st-century Polish people